The 2014 Danish Individual Speedway Championship was the 2014 edition of the Danish Individual Speedway Championship. The final was staged over two rounds, at Holstebro and Fjelsted, and was won by Niels Kristian Iversen. It was the third time Iversen had won the national title, having also been victorious in 2012 and 2013.

Event format 
The competition started with two semi finals, with four progressing to the final series from each. The final series was held over two rounds, with the top four scorers from the two rounds then competing in a Grand Final. The points from the Grand Final were then added to the total score and the overall winner was the rider with the most total points.

Semi finals

Final series

Final classification

References 

Denmark
2014 in Danish motorsport
Speedway in Denmark